Thijs Johannes Reinier van Dam (born 5 January 1997) is a Dutch field hockey player who plays as a forward for Rotterdam and the Dutch national team.

Club career
Born in Delft, van Dam started playing at Ring Pass Delft. After the under 14s, he switched to Rotterdam where he currently still plays in the first team.

International career
Van Dam's first international match was for the Dutch national indoor hockey team at the 2016 EuroHockey Indoor Championship, where they finished seventh. In November 2016, van Dam was selected for the 2016 Junior World Cup, where the team finished seventh. He made his debut for the senior national team in a test match in Cape Town, South Africa. He was not selected for the 2017 EuroHockey Championship so he played at the 2017 EuroHockey Junior Championship. He was part of the Dutch team that won the silver medal at the 2018 World Cup. Due to a hip operation, he had to mis the 2019 Pro League.

References

External links

1997 births
Living people
Sportspeople from Delft
Dutch male field hockey players
Male field hockey forwards
2018 Men's Hockey World Cup players
Field hockey players at the 2020 Summer Olympics
Olympic field hockey players of the Netherlands
HC Rotterdam players
Men's Hoofdklasse Hockey players
2023 Men's FIH Hockey World Cup players
20th-century Dutch people
21st-century Dutch people